"Don't Stay Home" is the first single released by 311 from their self-titled third album. A music video was also released for the single.

Music video

The music video seems to shift between winter and summer, as the band members are seen both with winter coats and shirtless. The video is mostly in black and white. The band can be seen playing the song throughout the video with water splashing in the background and other parts zoom up to Nick Hexum's face with him wearing the hood on his coat.

Track listing
"Don't Stay Home"

Charts

References

External links

1995 singles
311 (band) songs
Songs written by Nick Hexum
1995 songs